The ICF Canoe Freestyle World Championships are an international event in canoe freestyle organized by the International Canoe Federation. The ICF World Championships have taken place since 2007 although there were some "unofficial" events since at least 1995. They have been held biennially since the beginning except for 2021 when it was postponed to 2022.

Venues

International Canoe Federation
Competitions by year